This is a list of breweries in Birmingham, West Midlands, England.

Operational breweries

Defunct breweries

References

External links
Aston Manor Brewery Company Ltd
Birmingham Brewing Company
Brewhouse & Kitchen
Burning Soul Brewing
Froth Blowers Brewing Company Ltd
GlassHouse Beer Co
Glassjaw Brewing Company
Halton Turner Brewing Company
Indian Brewery Company
Leviathan Brewing Ltd
Moseley Beer Company
Sommar Brewing Company
Rock & Roll Brewhouse Ltd
Thousand Trades Brewing Company
Two Towers Brewery Ltd
Beer Geek Brewery Limited
Davenport's Brewery Ltd

Food and drink companies based in Birmingham, West Midlands
Manufacturing companies based in Birmingham, West Midlands
Birmingham
Birmingham, West Midlands-related lists